Rachel Berwick (born 1962) is an American visual artist whose sculptural installations explore themes of extinction and loss in the natural world.

Early life 
Born in Somers Point, New Jersey, Berwick grew up in a rural setting where she gained an appreciation for nature and biology. Berwick studied sculptural arts in the glass department at Rhode Island School of Design. She received her B.F.A. in 1984, and her M.F.A. from Yale School of Art in 1989.

Career 
Berwick is the head of the Glass Department at RISD.

Artwork 
Berwick has created art installations focused on bird migrations, language transmission, and dying species, often taking inspiration from the animal world. Inspired by Martha (passenger pigeon), Berwick cast 500 amber bird sculptures from a preserved passenger pigeon specimen for her installation entitled A Vanishing; Martha (2003–2005). For her living installation, entitled may-por-é (1996–present), Berwick trained parrots to mimic sounds and words from the Maipure language, as documented in the writings and research of Alexander von Humboldt. In her mixed-media video installation, entitled Lonesome George (2005–2010), Berwick invites the viewer to reflect upon the extinction of a species of Galápagos tortoise.

Berwick's art has been exhibited internationally and she has received many awards and fellowships, including the Anonymous Was A Woman Award (1996), a Smithsonian Artists Research Fellowship (2008), the Joan Mitchell Fellowship (2012), a Connecticut Artists Fellowship (2012), and a Robert Rauschenberg Foundation Artists Residency (2015).

References

External links 
 
 Smithsonian American Art Museum Meet the Artist interview

1962 births
Living people
Artists from New Jersey
Rhode Island School of Design alumni
Yale School of Art alumni
People from Somers Point, New Jersey